Athens "Kifissos" Bus Station, also known as KTEL Kifissos Bus station, is the busiest intercity bus station in Athens. It is the largest bus terminal in Athens and the second-largest in Greece, the largest being the Thessaloniki "Macedonia" Intercity Bus Station. It is located in Peristeri towards Kifissou Avenue or European route E75. There are a lot of routes to Peloponnese, Epirus, Macedonia and Ionian Islands. For Thessaly and Central Greece there are routes from the second intercity Bus Station of Athens in Patisia known as "Liosion Bus Station".

The bus station is used exclusively by KTEL buses. According to the latest available data, the station serves daily 24–44 thousands of passengers and around 12 million passengers annually. Due to the new highways such as Olympia Odos, Ionia Odos the routes have increased by 30% since 2009. The main buildings of the station are old and inadequate for a central bus station of a city like Athens. Inside the station, there are 63 ticket offices, some cafeterias and kiosks, and public toilets.

Athens International Airport is connected directly to Athens intercity bus station by city bus route X93 (Athens Mass Transit System). The buses set down passengers at the departures level and depart from the arrivals level of the airport, between exits 4 and 5. Bus route 051 connects the bus station with the Metaxourgeio metro station and Omonoia square. Bus route 052 connects directly the bus station and the Elaionas metro station of Line 3. Bus route 420 connects the station and the port of Piraeus.

New Athens intercity bus station 
There are plans to open a new bus station in Elaionas, Athens which will be serving all routes in Greece. The construction works are scheduled to begin in 2023 and the whole station will be operational in 2025. The total cost of the project is estimated at 180 million euros.

Destinations

See also 
Athens Liosion Bus Terminal (Bus Terminal B)

Transport in Athens
Bus stations in Greece